The 1978 Amco Cup was the 5th edition of the NSWRFL Midweek Knockout Cup, a NSWRFL-organised national club Rugby League tournament between the leading clubs and representative teams from the NSWRFL, the BRL, the CRL, the QRL, the NZRL, Western Australia and the Northern Territory.

A total of 38 teams from across Australia and New Zealand played 37 matches in a straight knock-out format, with the matches being held midweek during the premiership season.

Qualified Teams

Venues

Round 1

Round 2

Round 3

Round 4

Quarter finals

Semi finals

Final

As with all mid-season Cup games, the Final of the 1978 Amco Cup was broadcast into NSW by 0–10 with commentary from Ray Warren, Keith Barnes and in his first ever co-commentating role on television, legendary rugby league broadcaster Frank Hyde.

Player of the Series
Kevin Hastings (Eastern Suburbs)

Golden Try
 Mitch Brennan (St George)

Notes
 *- Advanced on penalty count-back

1978
1978 in Australian rugby league
1978 in New Zealand rugby league